The Clarkdale Arizona Central Railroad  is an Arizona short-line railroad that operates from a connection with the BNSF Railway at Drake, Arizona.  The AZCR runs  from Drake to Clarkdale, Arizona.  An excursion train also runs on the line through Verde Canyon and is operated by the same owners under the Verde Canyon Railroad.  The AZCR is owned by David L. Durbano.

Traffic
The AZCR handles 1,500 cars per year of inbound coal, coke, lime, bauxite, and fly ash to the Phoenix Cement Company and shipping outbound cement. The Verde Canyon Railroad carries 100,000 passengers per year (2013 figure).

History

Verde Valley Railway
From 1913 to 1989 the line was operated by the Atchison, Topeka and Santa Fe Railway (Santa Fe Railway).  On November 17, 1911, the Verde Valley Railway was chartered as a non-operating subsidiary of the Santa Fe Railway.  Construction from Cedar Glade (west of Drake) to Clarkdale was immediately commenced on February 13, 1912, and was completed on February 1, 1913, at a total cost of $1,286,061.  It was built to support the United Verde Mine at Jerome, Arizona.  On December 31, 1942, the Verde Valley was conveyed to the Santa Fe Railway by deed.

On April 14, 1989, the Santa Fe Railway sold the Clarkdale branch to David L. Durbano.  The new railroads were named the Clarkdale Arizona Central Railroad for freight and the Verde Canyon Railroad for passenger service. Passenger service resumed in November 1990.

Motive power
The AZCR has seven locomotives that were all built by originally by EMD.  The railroad has one EMD GP7 (AZCR 2164), two EMD GP9 (AZCR 3413) (AZCR 2279), a pair of former ICG Paducah-rebuild GP26's (2601 and 2602) recently acquired from the Cimarron Valley Railroad (2019), and a pair of EMD FP7s (1510 and 1512, used to power the excursion). The vintage FP7 diesel locomotives are two of only ten remaining in operation in North America. They were originally built for the Alaska Railroad in 1953 by the Electro-Motive Division of General Motors in LaGrange, Illinois.

Route
 Drake – BNSF Phoenix Subdivision
 Mack – goes not appear in timetable.
 Bear – named because a bear was shot there during construction.
 Perkinsville – a ghost town
 Sycamore
 Clarkdale

References

External links

 Verde Canyon Railroad, official website

Arizona railroads
Spin-offs of the Atchison, Topeka and Santa Fe Railway
Companies based in Arizona
Railway companies established in 1989